Moonlight Films is an American motion picture production and distribution company owned by James Ian Mair and James Stevenson that officially launched in 2012. It is best known for the horror anthology film Graveyard Stories and the Blood Cove slasher film franchise.

History

At the age of 9, James Ian Mair developed an interest in filmmaking after seeing Abbott and Costello Meet Frankenstein and began making short films in and around his childhood home. He and James Stevenson became friends in grade-school and continued their endeavors together, eventually leading to the production of three "test" films made while the duo attended high school,  The Man with Two Faces, Bloodstone and Bloodstone II. 

Mair and Stevenson had found their niche in the horror genre, often utilizing practical effects and focusing on classic horror elements such as vampires, ghosts and witches. 2012 marked the official beginning of their company and saw the release of "After Dark," their first venture to be released publicly and to be manufactured on DVD. Upon its release, it received positive reviews and again helped to spread the word of Moonlight Films in the Indie-film community. By this point in the company's run, Mair's brother and associate producer Benjamin Mair and actress Tara Bixler expanded their involvement and began assisting with many behind-the-scenes jobs. 

Taking a break from horror flicks, Mair directed 2015's "Weaver's Crossing," a family drama, to help expand the audience base. Viewers responded very well to the drama and a review from the Greene County Daily World called it the best work to date from the company. They continued this trend with 2015's "Night Crimes," a police drama with many familiar faces from the company's stock cast.

2015 also saw the biggest release to date from the company, with the horror-thriller "A Whisper in the Dark" starring Johnathan Gorman, Cassandra Schomer and sci-fi author Ruby Moon-Houldson. Longtime contributor C.A. McGregor was introduced into the fold in 2016 with the shot-for-YouTube short "A State of Mind." By this point, effects man and actor Deron Morgan also began to play an integral role in the company's development as well, leading to the effects-laden sci-fi production "The Shadow Zone" later that year.

Around the same time, Mair developed a working relationship with veteran b-movie icons Jim O'Rear and Lloyd Kaufman, who both played lead roles in the horror-anthology flick "Graveyard Stories." O'Rear returned in 2017's "Legend of Demoniac", which also starred frequent collaborator, actress Katie Harbridge. Harbridge would go on to star in the next two films for Moonlight, "The Maker of Monsters" and "Blood Cove." 

"The Maker of Monsters" was something of a turning point for the company, with the city of Baltimore being employed as the primary shooting location, vastly expanding the reach previously attained by the filmmakers. Genre legend George Stover starred in this film alongside Leanna Chamish, as well as Mair and Harbridge in leading roles. The film was more polished and technically sound than many that had come before, and this launched Moonlight into a new direction going forward. 2019 gave the micro-budget horror world both the slasher hit "Blood Cove", inspired from the slew of 80s slasher horror flicks, as well as a sequel to "Graveyard Stories," which proved less successful than the original. 

"Blood Cove 2: Return of the Skull" and "Fangs" were both released in 2020 and were received well online. It was also the year in which Moonlight Films joined the FearFlix channel on Roku, helping to expand their audience even more. 

Mair and Stevenson, along with core members Benjamin Mair, Deron Morgan and Tara Bixler continue to produce micro-budget horror films, averaging two pictures per year.

Filmography
 After Dark; 2012
 Weaver's Crossing; 2015
 A Whisper in the Dark; 2015
 Night Crimes; 2015
 The Shadow Zone; 2016
 A State of Mind; 2016
 A Whisper in the Dark 2; 2017
 Graveyard Stories; 2017
 Legend of Demoniac; 2018
 The Maker of Monsters; 2018
 Blood Cove; 2019
 Graveyard Stories 2; 2020
 Blood Cove 2: Return of the Skull; 2020
 Fangs; 2021
 Grim Reaper; 2021
 Grim Reaper 2; 2022
 Flesh Eaters; 2021

External links
Moonlight Films Official Web Site
James Ian Mair's IMDB Page
Official YouTube page

Mass media companies established in 2008
Film production companies of the United States
Film distributors of the United States
American companies established in 2008